Anthene juba, the anomalous ciliate blue, is a butterfly in the family Lycaenidae. It is found in Guinea, Sierra Leone, Liberia, Ivory Coast, Ghana, eastern Nigeria and western Cameroon. The habitat consists of primary forests.

References

juba
Butterflies of Africa
Lepidoptera of West Africa
Butterflies described in 1787